The Labyrinth is an elaborate maze in Greek mythology.

Labyrinth, Labyrint, and Labyrinthe may also refer to:

Arts, entertainment and media

Film and television 
 Labyrinth (1959 film), a German-Italian drama film
 Labyrinth (1986 film), a 1986 fantasy film directed by Jim Henson
 Labyrinth (1991 film), a 1991 German-Czech drama film directed by Jaromil Jireš
 Labyrinth (2002 film), a 2002 Serbian film
 Labyrint, a 2007 Swedish drama television series on TV4
 City of Lies, originally titled LAbyrinth, a 2018 American biographical crime thriller film directed by Brad Furman
 Labyrinth (opera), a 1963 television opera by Gian Carlo Menotti
 Labyrinth (miniseries), based on the Kate Mosse novel

Gaming 
 Labyrinth (solitaire), a card game
 Labyrinth (marble game), involving guiding a marble through a maze
 Labyrinth (board game) (formerly The Amazing Labyrinth), with shifting pieces forming a constantly changing maze
 Labyrinth (paper-and-pencil game), a logical paper-and-pencil game
 Labyrinth (1980 video game), for the TRS-80
 Labyrinth (1984 video game), for the BBC Micro
 Labyrinth Zone, a level in Sonic the Hedgehog (1991 video game)
 Sonic Labyrinth, for the Game Gear
 Labyrinth: The Computer Game, based on the 1986 film
 Labyrinth: Maō no Meikyū (Maze of the Goblin King), a Japanese exclusive video game published for the Famicom (also known as the Nintendo Entertainment System) and MSX computers, also based on the 1986 film
 Ken's Labyrinth, a 1993 first-person shooter developed by Ken Silverman
 Labyrinth: The War on Terror, 2001 – ?, a board game by Volko Ruhnke
 Labyrinthine, a solo and cooperative horror game developed and published by Valko Game Studios

Literature 
 Labyrinth (novel), a 2005 archaeological mystery novel by Kate Mosse
 "Labyrinth" (novella), a novella in the Vorkosigan Saga by Lois McMaster Bujold
 Labyrinths (short story collection), a 1962 collection of short stories and essays by Jorge Luis Borges
 The Labyrinth, a memoir by Walter Schellenberg

Music 
 Labyrinth (band), an Italian power metal band
 Labyrint (band), a Swedish hip hop band
 The Labyrinth (tour), 2010, by Leona Lewis

Albums 
 Labyrinth (Blutengel album), 2007
 Labyrinth (1986 soundtrack), soundtrack to the 1986 film Labyrinth
 Labyrinth (Equinox album), 1994
 Labyrinth (Juno Reactor album), 2004
 Labyrinth (Labyrinth album), 2003
 Labyrinth (Fleshgod Apocalypse album), 2013
 Labyrinths (Marilyn Crispell album), 1988
 Labyrinthes, the third studio album by Malajube, 2009
 Labyrinth (EP), the eighth EP by GFriend, 2020
 Labyrinth, Nucleus, 1973

Songs 
 "Labyrinth" (Cryalot song), 2022
 "Labyrinth" (Taylor Swift song), 2022
 "Labyrinth", a song on The Cure (The Cure album), 2004
 "Labyrinth", a song by Enter Shikari from the album Take to the Skies, 2007
 "Labyrinth", a song by GFriend on the EP 回:Labyrinth, 2020
 "Labyrinthian", a song by Misery Signals from the album Controller, 2008
 "Labyrinths", a song by Savatage from the album Edge of Thorns, 1993
 "The Labyrinth" ("Il labirinto armonico"), a concerto by Pietro Locatelli
 "Labyrinth", a song by Elisa from the album Pipes & Flowers

Other uses in arts and entertainment
 Labyrinth (artwork), a 2013 series of artworks by Mark Wallinger
 Labyrinth (Miró, Joan), the set of sculptures and ceramics by the artist Joan Miró
 Labyrinth, a ballet by Tim Rushton

Places 
 Labyrinth (Antarctica)
 Labyrinth Bay, in Nunavut, Canada

Science and technology 
 Bony labyrinth, part of the human ear
 Labyrinth fish, of suborder Anabantoidei, and the labyrinth organ, a defining characteristic
 Labyrinth seal, a type of mechanical seal

Other uses 
 Labyrinth Gallery, an art gallery in Lublin, Poland

See also 
 
 El laberinto (disambiguation)
 Labrinth (born 1989), English musician
 Labrynth (club), a 1990s club based in London
 Osseus Labyrint, an experimental multimedia arts entity
 Éditions du Labyrinthe, a French right-wing publisher officially known as Groupement de recherche et d'études pour la civilisation européenne